Sport Club Corinthians Alagoano, commonly referred to as Corinthians Alagoano, was a Brazilian professional football club based in Maceió, Alagoas. The team last participated in the Campeonato Alagoano in the 2013 season, before merging with Sport Club Santa Rita.

History
On 4 April 1991, the club was founded. Four years later, in 1995, the club competed in the Campeonato Alagoano Second Division, which the club won without losing a single match. The club gained the right to play in the following year's First Division, but the team's board of directors preferred to stay in the Second Division.

In 1997 the club joined a partnership with the Portuguese club Benfica. The club again competed in the Campeonato Alagoano Second Division. Corinthians Alagoano won again without losing a single match and was promoted to the First Division.

In 2000, the club, for the first time ever, played in a national competition. Corinthians Alagoano was in the green module (which was the competition equivalent to the Third Division) of Copa João Havelange. In the first stage, the club qualified for the first position in their group. However, they were eliminated in the second stage. In 2001, Corinthians Alagoano competed in the Campeonato Brasileiro Third Division. The club was the first-placed team in their group in the first stage, but was, however, eliminated in the second stage. In the following year, in 2002, after a poor performance, Corinthians was eliminated in the first stage of the Campeonato Brasileiro third division. Corinthians Alagoano competed again in the competition in 2003. Corinthians Alagoano's group consisted of Botafogo (PB) and Sousa, both of Paraíba state. The club was defeated in all four group matches it played. Corinthians Alagoano also took part in that year's Copa do Brasil, but was eliminated in the first stage by Flamengo of Piauí.

In 2004, Corinthians Alagoano won its first state championship, after defeating Coruripe in the final. In the same year, the club again was eliminated in the first stage of the Campeonato Brasileiro Third Division, finishing last in its group.

Titles
 Campeonato Alagoano: 2004
 Campeonato Alagoano Second Division: 1994 and 1997

Youth squad
The club was well known in Brazil because of his youth squad. Several famous players including among others Pepe and Luiz Gustavo were discovered by the club. Revealing new talented football players was one of the club's main priorities. The focus was on players between 15 and 22 years old.

The club's youth squad has competed in the Copa São Paulo de Futebol Júnior since 2000. In that year, the club was eliminated in the first round of the competition. In 2005, the club reached the third stage of the competition.

First Team
The first team as of 2011, consists of:

Logo and colors
The club was named after Sport Club Corinthians Paulista, of São Paulo state. The logo was also very similar to the logo of the São Paulo state's club.

Corinthians Alagoano's official colors were black, white and red.

Stadium 
Home stadium was the Nelsão stadium, capacity 10,000.

Anthem
The club's anthem was composed by Antônio Guimarães. It was sung by Carlos Moura.

References

External links
Official website

 
Association football clubs established in 1991
Defunct football clubs in Alagoas
Maceió
1991 establishments in Brazil